= Brahim Benmokrane =

Canadian civil engineer

Brahim Benmokrane is a Canadian civil engineer, currently a Canada Research Chair in Composite Materials used in Civil Engineering Structures and Research Chair in Innovative FRP Reinforcement for Sustainable Concrete Infrastructure at University of Sherbrooke and a Fellow of the Royal Society of Canada.
